Princess Elizabeth (22 May 1770 – 10 January 1840) was the seventh child and third daughter of King George III and Charlotte of Mecklenburg-Strelitz. After marrying the Landgrave of Hesse-Homburg, Frederick VI, she took permanent residence in Germany as landgravine.

Early life
The Princess Elizabeth was born at Buckingham House, London on 22 May 1770. Her father was the reigning British monarch, George III, the eldest son of Frederick, Prince of Wales and Augusta of Saxe-Gotha. Her mother was Queen Charlotte (née Princess Charlotte of Mecklenburg-Strelitz). She was christened in the Great Council Chamber at St. James's Palace, on 17 June 1770 by Frederick Cornwallis, the Archbishop of Canterbury.  Her godparents were The Hereditary Prince of Hesse-Cassel (her paternal first cousin once-removed, for whom The Earl of Hertford, Lord Chamberlain, stood proxy), The Princess of Nassau-Weilburg (her paternal first cousin once-removed, for whom The Dowager Countess of Effingham, former Lady of the Bedchamber to The Queen, stood proxy) and The Crown Princess of Sweden (another paternal first cousin once-removed, for whom The Countess of Holderness, Lady of the Bedchamber to The Queen, stood proxy).

The Princess' upbringing was very sheltered and she spent most of her time with her parents and sisters. King George and Queen Charlotte were keen to shelter their children, particularly the girls. However, in 1812, Princess Elizabeth purchased The Priory at Old Windsor in Berkshire as her private residence.

Character and interests
Elizabeth was known for her insistently optimistic attitude in spite of her stilted existence. Although she longed for marriage and a family of her own, Elizabeth was determined to enjoy her life by exploring and developing her varied interests and hobbies.  Elizabeth was a talented artist, producing several books of her own engravings to benefit various charities.  She was the only one of George III's children to share his interests in agriculture, running her own model farm at a rented cottage in Old Windsor.  She took great delight in the products of her garden, as well as the eggs, milk, and butter from her livestock.  Elizabeth's family teased her for her fondness of rich food and drink. She was very sensitive to criticism of her weight.

Elizabeth was also known for her well-developed sense of humor and maintained a large collection of jokes and witticisms. She had an open and plainspoken nature, and disliked excessive "politeness". She was closest to her sister Augusta and - uniquely among her sisters – her brother Edward, Duke of Kent and Strathearn. Elizabeth was also the closest daughter to their mother, which contributed to Charlotte's reluctance to let her marry.

Possible romantic relationships
It is alleged that Princess Elizabeth went through a form of marriage with George Ramus (1747–1808) and bore him a daughter, Eliza, in 1788. George Ramus was the son of Nicholas Ramus, who had been Page to Elizabeth's father King George. Any such marriage would have been null and void under the Royal Marriages Act 1772, but several of Elizabeth's brothers contracted similar alliances with commoners before marrying German princesses later in life. Eliza Ramus (1788–1869) was allegedly adopted and brought up by her uncle, Henry Ramus (1755–1822) of the East India Company. She married James Money (1770–1833), also of the East India Company, and her daughter Marian Martha (1806–1869) married George Wynyard Battye (1805–1888), a Bengal Judge. In widowhood, Eliza Ramus lived at 28 Chester Square in London, where she educated her Battye grandsons, all ten of whom became army officers, and cared for them when they were on sick or convalescent leave from India.

Largely denied opportunities to marry men of royal blood, several of Elizabeth's sisters embarked on romantic relationships with equerries and other high ranking men at court.  Elizabeth herself may have had such a relationship with diplomat Alleyne Fitzherbert, 1st Baron St. Helens.  St. Helens was much respected by George III, who created him a Lord of the Bedchamber in 1804.  Seventeen years older than Elizabeth, St. Helens was a frank, practical, and sharp-witted character known to dislike court life, qualities which Elizabeth shared. She referred to him as, "a dear and valuable saint," and said of him in a letter to her companion Lady Harcourt, "There is no man I love so well, and his tenderness to me has never varied, and that is a thing I never forget."  Elizabeth later wrote that she pined for St. Helens, eager to see him, "at all times, hours, minutes, days, nights, etc."  Elizabeth later commissioned a portrait of St. Helens from noted enamelist Henry Pierce Bone, evidence of her great attachment to him.  St. Helens in turn kept an enamel miniature of Elizabeth, also painted by Bone.

Marriage
In 1808 Elizabeth was reluctantly obliged to decline a proposal from the exiled Duke of Orléans (later King of the French as Louis Philippe I) due to his Catholicism and her mother's opposition.

During a ball in the British royal court in 1814 Elizabeth got to know the German Prince Frederick of Hesse-Homburg. When Elizabeth saw the Austrian officer in his elegant Hussar's uniform, she is supposed to have said, "If he is single, I will marry him!" Four years later, Elizabeth received a letter indicating that Frederick was asking for her hand in marriage.  Elizabeth was immediately interested, and her surviving sisters were supportive.  Although Frederick was said to be overweight and smell constantly of tobacco from his beloved meerschaum pipes, Elizabeth was undeterred in her goal to marry him.  Queen Charlotte refused to permit the union for weeks fearing Elizabeth's unavoidable move to Germany, but finally acquiesced when her daughter refused to back down.

Against all resistance, the wedding took place on 7 April 1818 in the private chapel in Buckingham Palace in Westminster.  Elizabeth wore a dress made of silver tissue and Brussels lace with ostrich feathers adorning her hair.  She was led to the altar by her second eldest brother, the Duke of York.  Neither her eldest brother the Prince Regent nor her father attended the wedding, kept away by gout and severe mental illness respectively.  The new couple honeymooned at the Prince Regent's house in Brighton.

It was not a real "love match", in spite of the mutual understanding and respect; in fact it was an agreement with which both were satisfied. Elizabeth was able to escape the constrictive environment of her home by moving to Germany with her husband, and Frederick gained many advantages by becoming allied with the British royal family.  However, Frederick remarked during his honeymoon that he was surprised to be happy and content in Elizabeth's presence; Elizabeth found her new husband to be intelligent, generous, and affectionate.  The marriage lasted until Frederick's death in 1829 and was described as very happy.

Later life
On 20 January 1820, Frederick succeeded his father as the Landgrave of Hesse-Homburg. Thanks to Elizabeth's dowry and annual allowance, he was able to remodel the palace in Homburg. For her part, Landgravine Elizabeth could bid farewell to the rigid court etiquette she had disliked in England. She also built him the Gothic House in the castle's grounds.

Elizabeth founded a care center and school in Hanover for children of working mothers.  While she was past childbearing age herself, Elizabeth found fulfillment in working with the children attending the school.

She died on 10 January 1840 at age 69 in Frankfurt am Main, Hesse, Germany. She was buried in the Mausoleum of the Landgraves, Homburg, Germany.

Exhibition
 2010: Das graphische Werk der Landgräfin Elizabeth 1770–1840 (The Graphic Works of Landgräfin Elizabeth), Museum im Gotischen Haus, Bad Homburg, Germany

Titles, styles, honours and arms

Titles and styles
 22 May 1770 – 7 April 1818: Her Royal Highness The Princess Elizabeth
 7 April 1818 – 20 January 1820: Her Royal Highness The Hereditary Princess of Hesse-Homburg
 20 January 1820 – 2 April 1829: Her Royal Highness The Landgravine of Hesse-Homburg
 2 April 1829 – 10 January 1840: Her Royal Highness The Dowager Landgravine of Hesse-Homburg

Arms
As of 1789, as a daughter of the sovereign, Elizabeth had use of the arms of the kingdom, differenced by a label argent of three points, the centre point bearing a cross gules, the outer points each bearing a rose gules.

Ancestors

References

 Michael A. Beatty (2003), The English Royal Family of America, from Jamestown to the American Revolution, p. 207

External links

|-

1770 births
1840 deaths
18th-century British people
19th-century British people
18th-century British women
19th-century British women
House of Hanover
British princesses
Hanoverian princesses
People from Old Windsor
People from Westminster
Children of George III of the United Kingdom
Daughters of kings